FC Issyk Kol Karakol is a Kyrgyzstani football club based in Karakol that plays in the top division in Kyrgyzstan, the Kyrgyzstan League. This is their first participation in the top division of Kyrgyzstan football.

History 
19??: Founded as FC Issyk Kol Przhevalsk.
1992: Renamed FC Issyk Kol Karakol.
1998: Renamed FC Karakol.
1999: Renamed FC Issyk Kol Karakol.
2003: Renamed FC Kol-Tor Karakol.
2004: Renamed FC Issyk Kol Karakol.
2011: Dissolved after spring round.

Achievements 
Kyrgyzstan League:
5th place: 2003

Kyrgyzstan Cup:

References
Career stats by KLISF
Kyrgyzstan League 2011 (Russian)

Football clubs in Kyrgyzstan
Association football clubs established in 2000
2000 establishments in Kyrgyzstan